The 2008 Tro-Bro Léon was the 25th edition of the Tro-Bro Léon cycle race and was held on 20 April 2008. The race was won by Frédéric Guesdon.

General classification

References

2008
2008 in road cycling
2008 in French sport